S-Curl is a trademark for a line of hair products produced by Luster Products designed to loosen the natural hair texture of people of African descent so that natural wave and curl patterns are looser and more prominent. The term "s-curl" soon came to describe the hairstyle acquired from the use of the S-Curl line products and the products of competitors.

Depending upon the strength of the application, an "s-curl" hairstyle can have hair texture only slightly less kinky than natural tightly coiled hair. Similar to a woman's permanent, an s-curl is applied using relaxers containing lye, and, like a jheri curl, requires continued use of specialized shampoos and conditioners to keep the chemically altered hair from becoming dry, hard, and brittle.

S-curls were most popular among African-American men during the 1990s, when many popular musicians such as Timbaland and the members of Dru Hill wore the hairstyle. While no longer wildly popular, S-Curl products and competing products continue to be sold.

External links
Luster's "S-Curl" website.

African-American hair